After Hours with Joe Bushkin is a ten-inch album released by Joe Bushkin in 1951 on Columbia CL 6201. It was also released as a seven-inch box set of four EPs on Columbia B-290.

Personnel
 Buck Clayton – trumpet
 Eddie Safranski – bass (4 tracks)
 Sid Weiss – bass (4 tracks)
 Jo Jones – drums
 Joe Bushkin – piano

Track listing 
 "Dinah"
 "If I Had You"
 "Once in a While"
 "California, Here I Come"
 "They Can't Take That Away from Me"
 "At Sundown" (W. Donaldson)
 "High Cotton" (Joe Bushkin)
 "Ol' Man River"

References

Columbia Records albums
1951 albums